Sheikh Md. Nurul Haque (15 November 1940 – 29 July 2020) was a Bangladesh Awami League politician and a Member of Parliament from Khulna-6.

Early life
Haque was born on 15 November 1940. He completed his law degree from the University of Dhaka.

Career
Haque was elected to Parliament on 5 January 2014 from Khulna-6 as a Bangladesh Awami League candidate. His son, Monirul Islam, has been accused of trying to grab land in Khulna in 2017. He lost the Bangladesh Awami League nomination for the next general election.

Death
On 29 July 2020, Nurul Haque died in Dhaka at the age of 79 due to complications brought on by COVID-19 during the COVID-19 pandemic in Bangladesh.

References

Awami League politicians
2020 deaths
1940 births
10th Jatiya Sangsad members
7th Jatiya Sangsad members
Deaths from the COVID-19 pandemic in Bangladesh